Gujarat State Road Transport Corporation, abbreviated GSRTC, is a Government State Transport Undertaking of Gujarat for passengers facilitating with road public transport in moffusil / city services. GSRTC operates within the state of Gujarat, India and neighboring states. It has a fleet of 8703 buses.

Overview

GSRTC has been incorporated since 1 May 1960 with 7 divisions, 76 depots and 7 divisional workshops, which has been expanding. The public undertaking is covering 98% of the villages and 99% population of Gujarat in addition to plying to major cities of the country (in long-distance routes).

Infrastructure across the state:
 16 divisions
 125 depots
 263 bus stations
 1554 pickup stands

Daily operation with:
 40,000 employees
 8703 buses
 8500 schedules
 47462 trips
 32.50 lakhs km
 25 lakhs passengers (99.5%) of population

 It covers 18,551 (99.33%) villages of Gujarat out of total 18,676 villages
 It has iconic one-of-its-kind Bus Ports in 6 major cities of Gujarat
 Technological up-gradation in major departments i.e. IT, technical, HR etc.
 GSRTC daily facilitates 13 lakh obligatory passengers including students out of total 25 lakh passengers by operating  8530 obligatory trips.

Divisions
GSRTC has 16 divisions:

Ahmedabad division referred as Aashram
Amreli division referred as Girnar
Bharuch division referred as Narmada
Bhavnagar division referred as Shetrunjay
Bhuj division referred as Kutch
Godhra division referred as Pavagadh
Himmatnagar division referred as Sabar
Jamnagar  division referred as Dwarka
Junagadh division referred as Somnath
Mehsana division referred as Modhera
Nadiad division referred as Amul
Palanpur division referred as Banas
Rajkot division referred as Saurashtra
Surat division referred as Surya Nagri
Vadodara division referred as Vishwamitri
Valsad division referred as Daman Ganga

In Ahmedabad division Gandhinagar depot has some special buses referred as Vikas Route .

Depots

New Bus Terminals

It is as per the vision of the Prime Minister when he was the Chief Minister of Gujarat to facelift the bus terminals with facilities that are available at international airports. The government has already built six such bus terminals - two in Ahmedabad at Gita Mandir and Ranip, two in Vadodara at Central and Makarpura, at Surat and Mehsana.Gujarat Chief Minister Vijay Rupani now proposed to build ten modern district level bus terminals at Amreli, Bhuj, Bharuch, Rajkot, Nadiad, Navsari, Modasa, Patan and Palanpur at a cost of Rs.913.30-crore with facilities for commercial activities. Boat jetties are also planned along with helipads. Every bus station will offer direct flights to Mumbai, Delhi and Bengaluru. GSRTC is training its drivers to fly helicopters and planes to start service. All these ten bus terminals, to be designed, built, operated and transfer model, will have a digital display, variable message sign boards, CCTV cameras, surveillance system, deluxe waiting hall, tourist information centre, cloakrooms, restaurants, food courts, plaza, budget hotels, and multiplex for commercial activities, besides Gujarat State Road Transport Corporation (GSRTC) administrative office, parcel room, maintenance workshop and fuel pumps. The bus terminals will have a clause for maintenance and repairs as an when required for 30 years.

Passenger
GSRTC purchased 1500+ new buses including air conditioned, Sleeper coaches Volvo buses in 2009 and also purchased 1000+ new Intercity Mini buses in 2017.
GSRTC daily 28 lakh kilometre with 40000 trips and catering daily 24 lakh passengers ... 
GSRTC provides online and mobile phone ticket booking facility. It also provides wi-fi internet service in Volvo buses for free. Currently the fleet of buses having online ticket booking facility includes Express, Gurjarnagri, Sleeper and Volvo buses.

Command & Control Center and IT Initiatives
GSRTC has established its Command & Control Center of GSRTC at Central Office, Ranip, Ahmedabad. 24 × 7 rigorous monitoring of various parameters in CCC (Command & Control Center) & DCCC (Division Command & Control Center) through various IT tools, i.e.,

 GPS based Integrated Vehicle Tracking & Passenger Information System
 Integrated Depot Management System
 Online Passenger Reservation System
 Inventory Management System
 Electronic Ticketing Machine
 Discipline & Appeal Management System
 MIS Generation
 Automated Fuel Management System
 Automated Driver Testing System
 CCTV Camera-based Surveillance Vigilance System
 Swatchh Bharat Abhiyan Mobile App
 24 × 7 toll-free helpdesk with IVRS
 Online Grievance Redressal
 MPLS – VPN

Technical
It has built up many technical facilities. Including:

 Three level maintenance and repair facility - 126 depot workshops, 16 divisional workshops and a central workshop
 7 Tyre retreading plant

Volvo Services
 Ahmedabad to Vadodara (frequency of every 15 minutes)
 Ahmedabad to Surat (frequency of every 30 minutes)
 Ahmedabad to Rajkot (daily 10 services)
 Rajkot to Vadodara (daily 4 services)

Intercity Minibus Services
 Ahmedabad to Vadodara (frequency of every 15 minutes)
 Ahmedabad to Surat (frequency of every 30 minutes) 
 Ahmedabad to Rajkot (frequency of every 1 hour)
 Ahmedabad to Anand (frequency of every 30 minutes)
 Ahmedabad to Nadiad (frequency of every 30 minutes)
 Ahmedabad to Dahod (frequency of every 20 minutes)
 Mehsana to Ranip (frequency of every 30 minutes) 
 Palanpur to Mehsana (frequency of every 30 minutes) 
Patan to Becharaji (frequency of every 30 minutes) 
 Surat to Navsari (frequency of every 20 minutes)
 Vadodara to Anand (frequency of every 15 minutes)
Vadodara to Godhara (frequency of every 30 minutes)
Godhara to Ahmedabad (frequency of every 20 minutes)
Rajkot to Jamnagar (frequency of every 1 hour)

etc. and many more Intercity services to and from major cities of Gujarat.

Service types
 Volvo Seater and Sleeper
A. C. Seater and Sleeper
 Non A. C.- Sleeper (2+1)
 Gurjar Nagri Express
 Deluxe Express
 Mini Bus (Mini Distance bus)
Ordinary

Buses used
 TATA
 Eicher
 Ashok Leyland
 Volvo
 Tata Marcopolo

Awards

References

External links
 
GSRTC

Transport in Gujarat
Bus companies of India
State agencies of Gujarat
State road transport corporations of India
1960 establishments in Gujarat
Government agencies established in 1960
Transport companies established in 1960
Indian companies established in 1960